João Varela is a settlement in the southern part of the island of Santiago, Cape Verde. It is part of the municipality of Ribeira Grande de Santiago.

References

Villages and settlements in Santiago, Cape Verde
Ribeira Grande de Santiago